Almir Memić (born 1 March 1962) is a Bosnian professional football manager and former player.

Playing career
Memić started playing football in Famos Hrasnica. After that, he played in various clubs from SR Bosnia and Herzegovina and other parts of former Yugoslavia; Čelik Zenica, Borac Banja Luka, Šibenik, Novi Sad, Mogren and Pazinka.

Memić also played for Konyaspor in the Turkish Süper Lig before he returned to Bosnia and Herzegovina in 1991.

He played for Željezničar during the late 1990s and early 2000s. Memić had collected 27 league appearances and scored 8 goals in three years at Željezničar and in 1998 won both the First League of Bosnia and Herzegovina and the Bosnian Supercup. In 2000, he won the Bosnian Cup. Memić ended his career at Željezničar in 2000 at the age of 38.

Managerial career
After finishing his playing career, Memić started working as a manager in Željezničar. He was first an assistant manager, and then, in March 2006, he was promoted to the position of manager of Željezničar, after Ratko Ninković had resigned. As he was just a replacement, Memić led the team only until the end of the season.

He came back to Željezničar in 2009, where he was an assistant of Amar Osim (2009–2013), Hajrudin "Dino" Đurbuzović (2013–2014) and Admir Adžem (2014), before once again becoming the manager of Željezničar in December 2014 replacing Adžem. However, less than a month later, in January 2015, Memić was controversially sacked without a game as Željezničar's manager, and Milomir Odović was named the new manager of the club.

After Željezničar, Memić managed Travnik from 2015 until 2016. From August to November 2016, he was for a second time the assistant manager of Amar Osim, this time at Qatar Stars League club Al Kharaitiyat. Memić also managed Goražde in 2017 and once again Travnik in 2018. On 2 October 2018, he was named manager of First League FBiH club Metalleghe-BSI. He left Metalleghe on 31 December 2018.

In January 2019, Memić was for a third time appointed as an assistant manager at Željezničar, again under the management of Osim. In June 2022, Velež Mostar appointed him as the club's new assistant manager, following Amar Osim becoming its manager.

Honours

Player
Čelik Zenica
Yugoslav Second League: 1982–83, 1984–85

Željezničar
First League of Bosnia and Herzegovina: 1997–98
Bosnian Cup: 1999–2000
Bosnian Supercup: 1998

References

External links
BiH Timovi u Yu ligi

1962 births
Living people
Footballers from Sarajevo
Association football forwards
Yugoslav footballers
Bosnia and Herzegovina footballers
FK Famos Hrasnica players
NK Čelik Zenica players
HNK Šibenik players
FK Borac Banja Luka players
Konyaspor footballers
RFK Novi Sad 1921 players
FK Mogren players
NK Pazinka players
NK Primorac 1929 players
FK Željezničar Sarajevo players
Yugoslav Second League players
Yugoslav First League players
Süper Lig players
Croatian Football League players
Premier League of Bosnia and Herzegovina players
Yugoslav expatriate footballers
Bosnia and Herzegovina expatriate footballers
Expatriate footballers in Turkey
Yugoslav expatriate sportspeople in Turkey
Bosnia and Herzegovina football managers
FK Željezničar Sarajevo managers
NK Travnik managers
FK Goražde managers
NK Metalleghe-BSI managers
Premier League of Bosnia and Herzegovina managers